André Clavé (1916–1981) was a French actor, director, theater director and Resistance fighter, deported during the Second World war, in the concentration camps of Buchenwald and of Dora.

Bibliography
 Francine Galliard-Risler, André Clavé : Théâtre et Résistance – Utopies et Réalités, A.A.A.C., Paris, 1998 – Ouvrage collectif écrit et dirigé par FGR, avec de très nombreux témoignages enregistrés et retranscrits – Préface de Jean-Noël Jeanneney - Épilogue de Pierre Schaeffer
 André Sellier, Histoire du camp de Dora, éditions de La Découverte, Paris, 1998
 Pierre Sudreau, Au-delà de toutes les frontières, 1991 ; 2è édition complétée : éditions Odile Jacob, 2002
 Pierre Saint-Macary, Mauthausen : percer l'oubli, éditions de L'Harmattan,coll. Mémoires du XXè siècle, Paris 2003
 Francine Galliard-Risler, Dora-Harzungen, la marche de la mort, Éditions Alan Sutton, St-Cyr-sur-Loire, 2005 – Ouvrage collectif dirigé par FGR – Préface de Pierre Sudreau – Introduction d’Alfred Jahn – Témoignages d'André Clavé, de René Haenjens, Wolf Wexler, préface de Pierre Sudreau, Jean Mialet – Évocation du réseau Brutus de la Résistance intérieure française ; ouvrage traduit et publié en Allemagne en 2015 sous le titre Todesmarsch in die Freiheit
 Francine Galliard-Risler, Todesmarsch in die Freiheit - durch den Harz, Iatros Verlag, 2015 – Traduction de Dora-Harzungen, la marche de la mort de FGR, 2005, traductrices (Überstzung) Helga Dahl-Dupont et Isabelle George
 Jocelyne Tournet-Lammer, Sur les traces de Pierre Schaeffer. Archives 1942-1995, avec des illustrations de Francine Galliard-Risler, Paris, Ina, La Documentation française, coll. « Fenêtre sur les archives de l’Ina », 2006
 Jean-Marc Binot et Bernard Boyer, Nom de code : Brutus. Histoire d'un réseau de la France libre, Fayard, 2007

See also 
 André Clavé on the French Wikipedia
 Francine Galliard-Risler on the French Wikipedia

References

1916 births
1981 deaths
French male stage actors
French theatre directors
French theatre managers and producers
20th-century French male actors